Patrick Herminie (born 22 September 1963) is a Seychellois politician who served as a Speaker of the National Assembly of Seychelles from 2007 to 2016.  He is a member of the People's Party. He was first elected to the Assembly in 1993 and served as Leader of Government Business from 1998 to 2003. He was elected as Speaker on 29 May 2007.

Following the opposition's victory in the September 2016 parliamentary election, Patrick Pillay was elected to succeed Herminie as Speaker of the National Assembly on 27 September 2016.

Early life, education and career
Patrick Herminie was born in the early hours of 22 September 1963, at Baie St. Anne Praslin Hospital, Seychelles’ second biggest island. Born to a local couple, a devoted housewife Christa Herminie (nee Christa Jules) and a respected and well liked policeman, Louis Herminie, Patrick was the fourth of five children.

A few years after he was born, Patrick’s mother and father, who had been living on Praslin since Mr. Herminie had been posted there for work, moved back to the main land (Mahe) along with their family, where they settled and raised their five children. During this time Patrick’s father continued to work as a policeman and his mother, who was once a seamstress, stayed at home to raise their children.

As a young boy Dr. Patrick Herminie attended Seychelles College. Seychelles College, originally an all-boys’ school, opened in 1947 and was then seen as the foundation of modern education in Seychelles, together with Regina Mundi Convent for girls. Both schools closed in the early 1980s after the government decided that education would be free and compulsory to all children, who had to attend schools in their respective districts.

At school, Patrick thrived as a student and got along well with all of his peers. Furthermore, Patrick not only excelled in his studies, he was also a great sportsman, especially in football whereby he led the Seychelles College based Schalke04 youth Football team as Captain in many competitions.

After completing his O Levels and A levels at Seychelles College, Patrick went on to do his Doctorate in General Medicine at Charles University in Prague, Czechoslovakia, which he completed in 1990. Upon returning from his studies in Czech Republic Patrick met his wife, Veronique Herminie (née Veronique Sinon) in 1991, and they went on to marry and had two children, Venessa Herminie and Martin Herminie.  Venessa is presently a medical doctor whereas Martin is a civil engineer. 

After completing his Doctorate in General Medicine, he was appointed Medical Officer at Victoria Hospital in 1990. He was promoted to Senior Medical Officer at Victoria Hospital in 1992 and then Director of the Environmental Health Section, Ministry of Health, in 1995. In the same year, he was awarded the Chevening Award by the British government, and he went on to complete his Masters in Public Health at the Nuffield Institute, University of Leeds in England.

After returning to Seychelles, Dr. Patrick Herminie was appointed Director General of Disease Prevention and Control in the Ministry of Health in 1996. In an effort to continuously improve his knowledge and skills set, Dr. Patrick Herminie has always made it his mission to continuously invest in his studies. In1997 he attended a Training of Trainers (Epidemic Control) which was held by the World Health Organization [WHO] in Addis Ababa, Ethiopia. In 1998 he was appointed Director General of the Division of Primary Health Care in the Ministry of Health.

Between the years 2000 to 2003, Dr. Patrick Herminie was Director General of Primary Health Care at the Ministry of Health. 

In 2004, Dr. Herminie decided to pursue a career as a full time politician (see political career) but had to temporarily stop in 2016 when nhi party lost the Legislative election. Dr. Herminie was, by then, the Speaker of the National Assembly.

So from 2016 to 2020 he served as Secretary of State for the Prevention of Drug Abuse and Rehabilitation. Seychelles was by then faced with an unprecedented epidemics of heroin addiction, Dr. Herminie set-up an Agency to deal with the problem head-on.

Political career
Dr. Patrick Herminie's political career began in 1992 when he was appointed Member of the Commission drafting the Constitution of the third Republic. In 1993 he was elected as Member of the National Assembly for English River Constituency, and was furthermore re-elected as Member for the National Assembly for the English River Constituency in 1998 and 2002.

Political offices
1998- 2007 Leader of Government Business in the National Assembly (Majority Leader) 

1998-2010 Member of the Central Committee of the Seychelles People’s Progressive Front, the then ruling party.    

2003 Re-elected Member of the National Assembly for English River Constituency 

2007- 2011 Oct. Speaker of the 4th National Assembly of Seychelles 

2011-2016 Sept. Speaker of the 5th National Assembly of Seychelles 

2015–2020 National Executive Committee Member for Parti Lepep/ United Seychelles. 

On the 31st of January, 2021, Dr. Patrick Herminie was elected the Leader of the United Seychelles Party, the main opposition political party.

Chairmanship
In 2012 Dr. Patrick Herminie was elected Chairperson of the Conference of Speakers and Presiding Officers of the Commonwealth (CSPOC) (Africa Region), a position he held till 2013.

Between the years 2015 to 2016 Dr. Patrick Herminie was elected as Member of the Executive Committee of the SADC Parliamentary Forum, as well as Chairperson of the Conference of Speakers and Presiding Officers of the Commonwealth (CSPOC) (International). 

During his time as speaker of the National Assembly and member of the Executive Committee of SADC Parliamentary Forum, Dr. Herminie aimed to raise the Assembly’s standards to meet international norms, additionally he reinforced the competence of its secretariat for it to better meet the needs of the new parliamentarians.

In 2017 President Danny Faure announced the composition of the Board of the new Agency for Prevention of Drug Abuse and Rehabilitation (APDAR).  The Board was headed by Dr. Patrick Herminie as Chairperson, he remained the chairperson until 2020.

References

Living people
Speakers of the National Assembly (Seychelles)
Members of the National Assembly (Seychelles)
People from La Rivière Anglaise
Seychellois physicians
United Seychelles Party politicians
1963 births
Charles University alumni